Four Corners is an unincorporated community in western Texas County, Oklahoma, United States. It is located at the western US-64/412/State Highway 3 - SH-95 junction in the Oklahoma Panhandle. Eva is two miles to the north and Guymon is located 22 miles to the east-southeast.

References

Unincorporated communities in Texas County, Oklahoma
Unincorporated communities in Oklahoma
Oklahoma Panhandle